1, Aney Marg in Patna is the official residence of the Chief Minister of Bihar. It has been named after Madhav Shrihari Aney, the Maharashtra born politician, who was also the state's second post-Independence Governor.  The sprawling fields surrounding the bungalow have been planted with 160 herbal and aromatic plants.

The former chief ministers of Bihar, Lalu Prasad Yadav and his wife Rabri Devi lived in it for 15 years. It is now the residence of present chief minister, Nitish Kumar. The previous chief ministers of Bihar to occupy the bungalow were, Bindeshwari Dubey, Bhagwat Jha Azad, Satyendra Narayan Sinha, Lalu Prasad, Rabri Devi & Jitan Ram Manjhi .

See also
List of official residences of India
List of Chief Ministers of Bihar
Raj Bhavan (Bihar)
Daroga Prasad Rai Path

References

Chief ministers' official residences in India
Buildings and structures in Patna
Government buildings in Bihar